Stephen Oziegebe Ojomoh, known as Steve Ojomoh (born 25 May 1970 in Benin City), is a Nigerian-born English former rugby union footballer and a current coach. He played as a flanker.

Club career
Ojomoh played for Moseley, Bath, and Gloucester in England, Overmach Parma in Italy, and Newport in Wales.

International career
Ojomoh had 12 caps for the England national team from 1994 to 1998, without ever scoring. He played at the Five Nations in 1994, 1995 and 1996. He was also present at the 1995 Rugby World Cup finals, where England reached the fourth place, playing four matches.

Coaching
After ending his player career, Ojomoh became a coach. He managed Trowbridge RFC, guiding them to success in winning the Intermediate cup against Leek RFC beating them 22 - 17.

References

External links
Steve Ojomoh International Statistics Sporting-Heroes.net

1970 births
Living people
Nigerian emigrants to the United Kingdom
English rugby union coaches
English rugby union players
Rugby union flankers
Newport RFC players
Bath Rugby players
Moseley Rugby Football Club players
Gloucester Rugby players
England international rugby union players
Black British sportsmen
English sportspeople of Nigerian descent
Sportspeople from Benin City